John de Mowbray, 4th Duke of Norfolk,  (18 October 144414 January 1476), known as 1st Earl of Surrey between 1451 and 1461, was the only son of John de Mowbray, 3rd Duke of Norfolk and Eleanor Bourchier. His maternal grandparents were William Bourchier, Count of Eu and Anne of Gloucester.

In 1451 the earldom of Surrey was revived for him. Mowbray was descended from a sister of the last earl of the previous creation.

In 1461 he succeeded his father as 4th Duke of Norfolk and hereditary Earl Marshal. He continued his father's efforts to possess Caister Castle, finally taking it in September 1469 after a siege. John Paston had inherited Caister from John Fastolf in 1459 and was in charge of defending it. Although Paston had been in Mowbray's service for several years, Mowbray showed a notable ruthlessness in his conduct of the siege, in which one Daubenay, a long-standing Paston servant, was killed. Under pressure from the Church, Norfolk did at least grant the other defenders safe conduct. In 1476, within a day of Norfolk's death, the Paston family took Caister back again.

Norfolk was invested as a Knight of the Garter in 1472. He died very suddenly, having apparently been in good health the day before.

He married Elizabeth Talbot, daughter of John Talbot, 1st Earl of Shrewsbury and his second wife Lady Margaret Beauchamp. They had only one child, Anne de Mowbray, 8th Countess of Norfolk, and so the 1397 creation of the dukedom became extinct upon his death. Anne, who was only 3 years old when her father died, inherited the earldom and his extensive lands and wealth.

The dukedom would be recreated in 1481 and again in 1483. The 1483 creation survives to the present day, despite two periods of forfeiture.

Family tree

References 

  (the fourth duke is discussed at the end of his father's article)
 

1444 births
1476 deaths
Barons Mowbray
11
104
Earls Marshal
7th Earl of Norfolk
25
21
Knights of the Garter
John